Conny Strömberg (born November 10, 1975) is a Swedish former professional ice hockey left winger. He last played for Tegs SK Hockey of HockeyEttan.

Strömberg played in SHL with Modo and Örebro HK.

References

External links

1975 births
Living people
HK Acroni Jesenice players
AIK IF players
IFK Arboga IK players
Asplöven HC players
Essen Mosquitoes players
Graz 99ers players
Herlev Hornets players
EV Landshut players
Lørenskog IK players
Modo Hockey players
Sheffield Steelers players
IF Sundsvall Hockey players
Swedish ice hockey left wingers
Tierps HK players
Tingsryds AIF players
Vaasan Sport players
Västerviks IK players
VIK Västerås HK players
HC Vita Hästen players
1. EV Weiden players
Örebro HK players
People from Örnsköldsvik Municipality
Sportspeople from Västernorrland County